Bernie Wrightson's Frankenstein is an illustrated edition of Mary Shelley's 1818 novel Frankenstein; or, The Modern Prometheus, first published in 1983 by American company Marvel Comics, with full-page illustrations by Bernie Wrightson. In 2008, a new edition was released by Dark Horse Comics for the 25th anniversary.

Publication history
This edition reprints the full novel by Mary Shelley (1831 edition), with illustrations by Wrightson. Wrightson spent seven years drawing approximately 50 detailed pen-and-ink illustrations. The book includes an introduction by Stephen King and from Wrightson himself. The illustrations themselves are not based upon the Boris Karloff or Lee films, but on the actual book's descriptions of characters and objects. Wrightson also used a period style, saying "I wanted the book to look like an antique; to have the feeling of woodcuts or steel engravings, something of that era" and basing the feel on artists like Franklin Booth, J.C. Coll and Edwin Austin Abbey.

Wrightson has said that it was an unpaid project:

To help fund this labor of love, Wrightson released three portfolios of his Frankenstein illustrations in 1977, 1978, and 1980 in advance of the publication of the full book in 1983. Each portfolio contained six 11x16 inch plates. The text accompanying the third portfolio said:

In August 1993, Apple Press published The Lost Frankenstein Pages, which collects unused finished artwork as well as sketches and studies by Wrightson. 

In 1994, Underwood-Miller published a new edition of the novel containing some of these previously unused illustrations, bringing the total from 43 to "over 45."

In October 2008, for the 25th anniversary of the first edition, a new edition was prepared and released with 47 illustrations by Dark Horse Comics in an oversized (9" x 12"), hardcover format scanned from the original artwork, when it could be tracked down.

Simon & Schuster's Gallery Books imprint released a new version in August 2020 in hardcover and a paperback is scheduled for April 2021; however, the size for both is a smaller 6"x9", reducing the detail in Wrightson's artwork.

Frankenstein Alive, Alive!
In 2012, Wrightson and writer Steve Niles began publishing a comic book series titled Frankenstein Alive, Alive! which is billed as a "sequel to Wrightson's acclaimed 1983 illustrated version" by IDW Publishing. Wrightson won his first National Cartoonists Society's award in the category Comic Books for Frankenstein Alive, Alive! in 2013.

References

External links
 Bernie Wrightson's Frankenstein
 
 
 

1983 books
1983 comics debuts
1983 comics endings
Horror comics
Dark Horse Comics titles
Marvel Comics titles
Comics based on Frankenstein
Comics set in the 19th century
Comics set in Germany